Eutretosoma is a genus of tephritid  or fruit flies in the family Tephritidae.

Species
Eutretosoma kovacsi (Hering, 1941)
Eutretosoma marshalli Bezzi, 1924
Eutretosoma oculatum (Hendel, 1914)
Eutretosoma woodi Bezzi, 1924

References

Tephritinae
Tephritidae genera
Diptera of Africa